

Launchers 

1940s
MX-774 (1946)

1950s

PGM-11 Redstone (1950–1964) 
SM-65 Atlas (1953 - 1965)
PGM-19 Jupiter (1954 - 1961)
PGM-17 Thor (1957 - 1960)
SM-65A Atlas (1957 - 1958)
Vanguard (1957-1959)
Juno I (1958) 
SM-65B Atlas (1958–1959) 
Thor-Able (1958–1960)
Juno II (1958–1961)
SM-65C Atlas (1958 - 1959)
Titan I (1959–1965)
SM-65D Atlas (1959–1967)
Atlas-Able (1959–1960)
Thor-Agena (1959-1968)
Little Joe (1959–1961)

1960s

Atlas-Agena (1960–1978)
Thor-Ablestar (1960–1965)
Thor-Delta (1960–1962)
SM-65E Atlas (1960-1995)
Mercury-Redstone Launch Vehicle (1960–1961)
Atlas LV-3B (1960–1963)
Scout (1961–1994)
Saturn I (1961–1965)
SM-65F Atlas (1961-1981)
Titan II (1962-2003)
LGM-30 Minuteman (1962-1970)
Atlas-Centaur (1962–1983)
Delta A (1962)
Delta B (1962–1964)
Little Joe II (1963–1966)
Delta C (1963–1969)
Titan II GLV (1964–1966)
Delta D (1964–1965)
Titan IIIA (1964–1965)
Thor-Burner (1965–1976)
Titan IIIC (1965–1982)
Atlas E/F (1965–2001)
Delta E (1965–1971)
Atlas SLV-3 (1966–1968)
Saturn IB (1966–1975)
Titan IIIB (1966–1987)
Thorad-Agena (1966 - 1972)
Delta G (1966–1967)
Saturn V (1967–1973)
Delta J (1968)
Delta L (1969–1972)
Delta M (1968–1972)
Delta N (1968–1972)

1970s

Titan IIID (1971–1982)
Delta 0100 (1972–1973)
Delta 1000 (1972–1975)
Titan IIIE (1974-1977)
Delta 2000 (1974–1981)
Delta 3000 (1975–1989)
Thor DSV-2U (1976–1980)

1980s

Conestoga  (1981-1995)
Space Shuttle (1981–2011)
Titan 34D (1982–1989)
Atlas H (1983–1987)
Atlas G (1984–1989)
Titan 23G (1988–2003)
Delta II (1989–2018)
Titan IV (1989–2005)
Delta 4000 (1989–1990)
Delta 5000 (1989)

1990s

Pegasus (1990–present)
Commercial Titan III (1990–1992)
Atlas I (1990–1997)
Atlas II (1991–2004)
Minotaur-C/Taurus (1994–present)
Athena (1995–2001)
Delta III (1998–2000)

2000s

Minotaur I (2000–present)
Minotaur II (2000–present)
Atlas III (2000–2005)
Atlas V (2002–present)
Delta IV (2002–present)
Falcon 1 (2006-2009)

2010s

Minotaur IV (2010–present)
Falcon 9 (2010–present)
Ares I (2011–present)
Ares V (2011–present)
Antares (2013–present)
Minotaur V (2013-present)
New Shepard (2015-present)
Electron (2017–present)
Falcon Heavy (2018–present)

2020s

LauncherOne (2020–present)
Firefly Alpha (2021-present)
Space Launch System (2022-present)
SpaceX Starship (Under development, expected 2023)
Vulcan Centaur (Under development, expected 2023)
New Glenn (Under development, expected 2023)
Neutron (Under development, expected 2024)
Red Dwarf (Under development, expected 2024)

Sounding rockets 

1940s
WAC Corporal (1945–1947)
Deacon(1947–1957)
Aerobee (1947–1958)
 Bumper-WAC (1948-1950)

1950s

Loki (1955–2001)
Asp (1955–1962)
Jupiter-C (1956–1957)
Skylark (1957–2005)
Arcas (1959–1991)
Javelin (1959–1976)

1960s

Astrobee (1960–1983)
Nike Apache (1961–1978)
Thor DSV-2 (1962–1975)
Hopi Dart (1963–1964)

2000's

Mesquito (2008–present)
ALV X-1 (2008)

References

United States